The Philadelphia High School for Girls, also known as Girls' High, is a public college preparatory magnet high school for girls in Philadelphia, Pennsylvania. As its name suggests, the school's enrollment is all female.

Established in 1848, it was one of the first public schools for women. It is a magnet school in the School District of Philadelphia with a competitive admissions process. Vincit qui se vincit (she conquers who conquers herself) is the school's motto. The school is located at Broad Street and Olney Avenue in the Logan section of Philadelphia.

History

In 1848, the Girls' Normal School was established as the first secondary public school for women in Pennsylvania. It was also the first municipally supported teachers' school in the U.S. The first instructional session was held on February 1, 1848. By June 1848, there were 149 enrolled students, an incredibly large enrollment for a school at that time. The school continued to grow, forcing a move in 1854 to Sergeant Street between Ninth and Tenth Streets.

In April 1854, the name of the school was changed to the Girls' High School of Philadelphia. By June 1860, 65 graduates had received diplomas bearing the Girls' High School name. In 1860, the name of the school was again changed to The Girls' High and Normal School to better define the "design of the institution" as a school for an education confined to academic subjects and for future teachers.

In October 1876, a new school which "for convenience and comfort will probably have no superior" was constructed at Seventeenth and Spring Garden Streets. At the time it was surpassed in size only by Girard College and the University of Pennsylvania.

In 1893, the High School and Normal School were separated into two distinct institutions. It was at this time that the institution became known as the Philadelphia High School for Girls. The school offered three parallel courses: a general course of three years with a possible postgraduate year, a classical course of four years, and a business course of three years. In 1898, a Latin-Scientific course "was designed to prepare students for the Women's Medical College, Cornell, Vassar, Wellesley, Smith, Barnard, or such courses in the University of Pennsylvania as were open to women."

In the early 1930s, the school survived attempts to merge it with William Penn High School. Alumnae, faculty and friends of the school dedicated themselves to its preservation. The school emerged from this crisis with its current identity as a place for the education of academically talented young women.

In 1933, a new school was erected at Seventeenth and Spring Garden Streets to replace the one which had stood on the site since 1876. This historic building, now the site of Julia R. Masterman School, was added to the National Register of Historic Places in 1976.

In May 1976, Vice Principal Dr. Florence Snite sued Katherine Day for libel because she had organized a demonstration protesting the administration's policy which barred lesbian alumnae from attending the prom.

In 1958, the school again outgrew its location and moved to its current site at Broad Street and Olney Avenue. Located down the street at Ogontz and Olney Avenue is Central High School, which, until 1983, was an all-male school. Prior to Central turning co-educational, the two schools enjoyed a strong partnership.

Graduating classes at Girls' are known not by class year (e.g., "the class of 2008") but rather by class number (e.g., "the 252nd graduating class"). This is because of the former practice of semiannual graduation. As annual graduations were instituted, the practice of referring to class numbers remained.

Many fine traditions have survived Girls' long history. Annual celebrations include Contest and County Fair. Graduation traditions also continue. Girls' High graduations were formerly held at the Academy of Music.  Currently, they are held at the Kimmel Center for the Performing Arts. Students wear white dresses no higher than knee length and carry red flowers. The students purchase their own dresses in any style but the rules of color and length are enforced.

Due to budget cuts, Girls' High will now be losing staff including counselors in the 2013-14 school year. Also, some clubs may be eliminated from the school.

As of 1984, Girls' High had the unique distinction of being the only high school in the U.S. to have had three graduates selected as White House Fellows since the program was started by President Lyndon B. Johnson in 1964.

In 2000, the school had its first Million Dollar Scholar. She received a perfect grade-point average and was offered $1 million in college scholarships.

Traditions

 Big Sister, Little Sister – Seniors are paired with incoming freshmen and act as their "big sisters". The "big sisters" provide transitional support to their "little sisters".
 Freshman Day, Sophomore Day, Junior Day – Each class is given a day to honor it. Students of the honored class generally sport flowers in their class color, host an auditorium show, and have a tea or other social gathering.
 Senior Day – Graduating seniors are given awards for their academic and extracurricular achievements. After the awards ceremony, they have lunch, often on the Spirit of Philadelphia or at the Chart House.
 Contest – started in 1913 and has evolved over the years. The seniors and freshmen team up to compete against the sophomores and juniors in a variety of competitions that span a few weeks.
 County Fair – A schoolwide all-afternoon fair in which each advisory class contributes food, games, and entertainment. All the money earned during county fair is given to a charity of choice by the winning advisory.
 Songs of the Season – The school's holiday show. The program begins with the procession of members of the school's Treble Clef Choir through a completely dark auditorium. Each choir member carries a single lit candle and chants "Hodie Christus Natus Est" by Benjamin Britten. The show continues with holiday performances by the school's various extracurricular groups and ethnic clubs. Jill Scott (a Girls' High alumna) made an appearance at Songs of the Season in 2006.
 Career Day – Alumnae return for a day to give presentations about their careers.
 Holiday Open House – Every year, alumnae return to the school for a Holiday Open House. This is held in the pink marble hall with the Nike of Samothrace or Winged Victory, which is the symbol of Girls' High, at one of the hallway and Abraham Lincoln at the other.
 All Alumnae Reunion Luncheon/Meeting –  Alumnae from all class years gather together to network with each other.  The guest speaker is usually a distinguished alumna. There is also a performance by a student group.
 Graduation – ceremony at the Academy of Music, and now at the Kimmel Center. All graduates wear white dresses and carry a bouquet of red carnations.

Additional school events
 Father-Daughter Dance
 Winter Dinner Formal
 Soph Hop
 Junior Prom
 Senior Prom
 Zero Day
 Junior Book Awards
 Move Up Day

School song
The school song has two parts. Alma Mater was written by Grade Gordon (1906) with music by F. Edna Davis (1906). Fidelitas was written by Emily Loman in June 1915.

School seals

Notable alumnae

 Erika Alexander - actress and producer
 Gloria Allred - attorney
 Tanya "Rafika" Anderson - U.S. diplomat; Consul General to Barcelona and Guadalajara 
 Leslie Esdaile Banks - novelist
 Hon. Deborah Batts -  Judge of the United States District Court for the Southern District of New York
 Becky Birtha - poet and author
 Susan Braudy - author, journalist and Pulitzer nominee
 Elaine Brown - first woman head of the Black Panther Party
 Vanessa Lowery Brown - Democratic member of the Pennsylvania House of Representatives who was convicted of bribery
 Blondell Reynolds Brown - politician; only woman to serve as Philadelphia City Councilmember At-Large 1999-2015 
 Bebe Moore Campbell - author
 Mary Schmidt Campbell - president of Spelman College
 Barbara Chase-Riboud - artist, sculptor, bestselling novelist and award-winning poet
 Buntzie Ellis Churchill - president of World Affairs Council
 Constance Clayton - first woman and first African American Superintendent of the School District of Philadelphia
 Mae Virginia Cowdery - poet
 Reed Erickson - philanthropist; transgendered man who provided early support to the LGBT movement 
 Jessie Redmon Fauset - Harlem Renaissance novelist; editor of The Crisis 
 Eileen Folson (Eileen Garden Folson) - Grammy-nominated musician, Broadway composer (218, 1974) 
 Shirley Clarke Franklin - first woman mayor of Atlanta, GA
 Vanessa Northington Gamble - physician; authority on public health; chaired the Tuskegee Syphilis Study Legacy Committee
 Julie Gold - Grammy-winning songwriter, singer (218, 1974)
 Tina Sloan Green - athlete
 Edith Grossman, Ph.D. (Edith Dorph Grossman) - translator of modern Latin American literature
 Helene Hanff - author, wrote 84 Charing Cross Road
 Barbara Harris - first woman ordained a bishop of the Episcopal Church
 Lillian Hoban - American illustrator and children's writer; published in over 1,400 publications; Lewis Carroll Shelf and Christopher Award winner
 M. Lindsay Kaplan - academic; Georgetown University English professor; scholar of early modern English literature and Jewish studies 
 Minnie Kenny - cryptologist; early NSA employee; former Chief of Language and Linguistics for the Office of Techniques and Standards of the NSA 
 Milly Koss - computing pioneer
 Virginia Knauer - economic advisor to President Nixon and President Ford; first Director of the Office of Consumer Affairs
 Pinkie Gordon Lane - first African American poet laureate of Louisiana
 Carol Lazzaro-Weis - professor of Italian and French, translator and scholar
 Lisa Lopes - member of the best-selling female American group of all time, TLC
 Hon. Frederica Massiah-Jackson - President of the Philadelphia Court of Common Pleas
 Jeanette DuBois Meech – evangelist and industrial educator
 Pauline Oberdorfer Minor - one of the founders of Delta Sigma Theta sorority
 Wanda Nesbitt - U.S. Ambassador to Namibia (218, 1974)
 Barbara Nissman - pianist in the grand Romantic tradition
 Ann Hobson Pilot - principal harpist, Boston Symphony Orchestra
 Howardena Pindell - artist, first African American curator at MoMA, activist for minorities in the arts, researcher and author
 Sharon Pinkenson - Executive Director of the Greater Philadelphia Film Office
 Liza Redfield - American conductor, pianist, and composer; first woman to be the full-time conductor of a Broadway pit orchestra
 Katherine Gilmore Richardson - politician; Philadelphia City Councilmember At-Large
 Hon. Lisa Richette (Lisa Aversa Richette) - Philadelphia Court of Common Pleas judge, legal pioneer, social activist, and author
 Judith Rodin (Judith Seitz Rodin) - first woman President of the University of Pennsylvania; President of the Rockefeller Foundation
 Jill Scott - singer and actress
 Hon. Dolores Sloviter (Dolores Korman Sloviter) - first woman named Chief Judge of the U.S. Court of Appeals, Third Circuit
 Deborah Leona Smith Hill - Graduate of Westminster Choir College, accomplished organist and fine artist. 
 Marion Stokes - civil rights activist, founding Board member for the National Organization for Women, and philanthropist. Data and media archivist who recorded every news broadcast for decades. Her 70,000 tapes are being digitized by the Internet Archive.
 Zoe Strauss - photographer; nominee member of Magnum Photos
 Sandra Strokoff - first woman Legislative Counsel of the U.S. House of Representatives
 C. Delores Tucker - politician and civil rights activist
 Helen L. Weiss - composer and pianist
 Lisa Yuskavage - artist (224, 1980)
Rebecca S. Pringle -  President, National Education Association

Notable faculty
 Ida Augusta Keller - plant physiologist; taught at the school, 1893–1930

References

Sources
 The Public Schools of Philadelphia: Historical, Biographical, Statistical by John Trevor Custis, Burk & McFetridge Co. Publisher, 1897, Pg. 153&c.: Girls' Normal School, Girl's High School, Girls' High and Normal School

External links

 
 ;  

 Alumnae Association Alumnae Association of the Philadelphia High School for Girls

1848 establishments in Pennsylvania
Educational institutions established in 1848
Girls' schools in Pennsylvania
High schools in Philadelphia
Logan, Philadelphia
Magnet schools in Pennsylvania
Public girls' schools in the United States
Public high schools in Pennsylvania